K-1 Revenge, known in Japan as , is a video game based on the K-1 martial arts organization in Hong Kong, developed by Daft and published by Xing Entertainment in Japan in 1997, and by Jaleco in North America in 1999. It is the fifth game in the K-1 Fighting series.

Reception

The game received mixed reviews according to the review aggregation website GameRankings. In Japan, Famitsu gave it a score of 25 out of 40.

Notes

References

External links
 

1997 video games
Jaleco games
K-1
Martial arts video games
Multiplayer and single-player video games
PlayStation (console) games
PlayStation (console)-only games
Video game sequels
Video games developed in Japan
Xing Entertainment games